The Tizinafu River, also spelled Tiznef River,  Tiznaf River,  Tiznap River,  Tizinapu River, formerly known as the Tingzaabu River (听杂阿布河), is a river in the Xinjiang Uygur Autonomous Region of the People's Republic of China, located in southeast Kashi, originates in the northern slope of the Kunlun Mountains.

Historically, Tizinafu River was once a tributary of the Yarkand River, and has gradually evolved into an independent river under the influence of water diversion from the plain irrigation area.  The river has a total length of 335 kilometers,  a catchment area of about 20,390 square kilometers, and an average annual runoff of about 845 million cubic meters.

References

Rivers of China
Rivers of Xinjiang